The following list is a list of rivers of the United States.

Alphabetical listing 

Listings of the rivers in the United States by letter of the alphabet:

A - B - C - D - E - F - G - H - I - J - K - L - M - N - O - P - Q - R - S - T - U - V - W - XYZ

By state and territory 

 Alabama
 Alaska
 Arizona
 Arkansas
 California
 Colorado
 Connecticut
 Delaware
 Florida
 Georgia
 Hawaii
 Idaho
 Illinois
 Indiana
 Iowa
 Kansas
 Kentucky
 Louisiana
 Maine
 Maryland
 Massachusetts
 Michigan
 Minnesota
 Mississippi
 Missouri
 Montana
 Nebraska
 Nevada
 New Hampshire
 New Jersey
 New Mexico
 New York
 North Carolina
 North Dakota
 Ohio
 Oklahoma
 Oregon
 Pennsylvania
 Rhode Island
 South Carolina
 South Dakota
 Tennessee
 Texas
 Utah
 Vermont
 Virginia
 Washington
 Washington, D.C.
 West Virginia
 Wisconsin
 Wyoming

 American Samoa
 Guam
 Northern Mariana Islands
 Puerto Rico
 US Virgin Islands

See also 
List of longest rivers of the United States (by main stem)
List of National Wild and Scenic Rivers
List of river borders of U.S. states
List of rivers in U.S. insular areas
List of rivers of the Americas by coastline
List of U.S. rivers by discharge

External links
American Rivers, a nonprofit conservation organization
U.S. Geological Survey name database
Wisconsin DNR Watershed Search
, GEOnet Names Server